Griffinia hyacinthina is a bulbous species of flowering plant which is endemic to Brazil. The plant has blue flowers (as suggested by the specific epithet "hyacinthina"), collected into an umbel. The leaves are green, elliptical and petiolate.

This species of Griffinia grows in a very specific habitat. It requires the warmth, deep shade and high humidity of the tropical rainforest where the floor is covered with large quantities of organic matter. Like related species, G. hyacinthina is endemic to Brazil. It is native to the south-eastern part of the country, specifically the Atlantic Forest.

Two varieties of the species have been described:

Griffinia hyacinthina var. micrantha
Griffinia hyacinthina var. maxima

References 

Amaryllidoideae